11th Brigade may refer to:

Australia
 11th Brigade (Australia)

India
 11th Cavalry Brigade (British Indian Army)
 11th Indian Cavalry Brigade
 11th Indian Infantry Brigade

Japan
 11th Brigade (Japan)

Spain
 XI International Brigade

United Kingdom
 11th Armoured Brigade (United Kingdom)
 11th Infantry Brigade (United Kingdom)
 11th Mounted Brigade (United Kingdom)
 11th Signal Brigade (United Kingdom)
 XI Brigade, Royal Horse Artillery

United States
 11th Infantry Brigade (United States)